Obsession Telescopes is an American telescope company which specializes in the production of Dobsonian telescopes. The company released the first truss commercially available Dobsonian telescope. It is also the largest producer of Dobsonian telescopes, and has worldwide operations.

Obsession Telescopes was founded in 1989 by David Kriege and is based in Lake Mills, Wisconsin. According to Kriege, the inspiration for the company came from a star party he attended, and 'experienced' Dobsonian type telescopes for the first time. Learning of the cheap costs of building a Dobson style telescope from fellow star gazers at this party, he went on to build the Dobson style Obsession 1 telescope. Early on, despite the style of the telescope being new to the market, it gained popularity among astronomy enthusiasts over time.

Obsession Telescopes have also been used by academic institutions and some professional observatories in addition to being used for astrophotography. An Obsession Telescope 25" was the largest aperture telescope at the Custer Observatory in New York State for a time.

Products and Design
Among the telescopes built at Obsession Telescopes are Dobsonian telescopes with 12.5-inch mirrors, and telescopes with computerized positioning which are based on an ultra-compact style.

The compactness is achieved by making the traditional Dobsonian design collapsible. In this way, the truss shrinks down to a smaller size enabling easier transportation of a bigger telescope with a larger diameter aperture mirror to a star party, which are highly popular in the amateur astronomy community.

Provided that the overall quality is maintained, a bigger aperture can improve many aspects of telescope performance for example, an 18-inch diameter telescope has five times the light-gathering power of an 8-inch telescope, all else being equal. In addition, the bigger telescope has finer resolution and better contrast with the gathering of more light allowing for clearer visibility of fainter astronomical objects.

Primary mirrors are supplied by Optical Mechanics, Inc. (OMI) and Ostahowski Optics, while secondary mirrors are supplied by United Lens.

In 2007, Obsession Telescopes released their new line of highly portable telescopes which they designated as UC (Ultra Compact), thereafter referring to their original line of telescopes as "Classic" models.

Among the many accessories offered by Obsession Telescopes on their range of telescopes are the: ServoCAT drive system, JMI focusers and Wildcard Innovations' Argo Navis Digital Telescope Computer (DTC)

Models
Obsession telescopes available circa 2012 ranged in price from over $3000 USD for the 12.5 inch to $12–15,000 USD for the 25 inch, manufacturing only a limited number of 30" and 36" telescopes.

In 2009, Obsession Telescopes assisted OMI in the design of the OMI Evolution-30. The company's telescopes available circa 2009, twenty years afters its founding in 1989, ranged in price from over $3000 USD for the 12.5 inch to $12–15,000 USD for the 25 inch.

Aperture, Focal Ratio, Focal Length
12.5 inch, f/5, 63 inch 
15"  ,	f/4.5, 68" 
15" UC, f/4.2, 63" 
18"  ,f/4.5, 81"	
18" UC, f/4.2,	75" 
20" ,	f/5,100" 
20" ,f/4,80"
25" ,f/5,125" 
25" , f/4, 100"

Awards
The Obsession 18" f/4.2 UC ('Ultra Compact') won a Sky & Telescope Magazine Hot Product of 2008 Award.

See also
Meade Instruments
Celestron

References

Further reading
 Sky & Telescope, February 2009, "Obsession 12.5" Review"
 Kriege, David and Richard Berry. The Dobsonian Telescope: A Practical Manual for Building Large Aperture Telescopes. Richmond, VA: Willmann-Bell, 1997.

External links
Obsession company website
Website about using 20" telescope purchased from  Obsession Telescopes

Telescope manufacturers
Companies established in 1989
Jefferson County, Wisconsin
Companies based in Wisconsin